James Michael Strickland (born June 12, 1946) is an American former professional baseball player. A left-handed pitcher, he appeared in 60 Major League games, all in relief, over four seasons for the Minnesota Twins (1971–1973) and Cleveland Indians (1975).

The ,  Strickland allowed 63 hits and 44 bases on balls in 77⅓ MLB innings pitched. He struck out 60 and earned five saves.

External links

1946 births
Living people
Albuquerque Dodgers players
Baseball players from California
Cleveland Indians players
Major League Baseball pitchers
Minnesota Twins players
Oklahoma City 89ers players
Pocatello Chiefs players
Portland Beavers players
Salem Dodgers players
San Antonio Brewers players
Santa Barbara Dodgers players
Tacoma Twins players
Toledo Mud Hens players